The Kysucké Beskydy is a set of mountain ranges in the Kysuce region of northern Slovakia.  Slovaks consider the mountains to belong to the Central Beskids, of the Outer Western Carpathians, while Poles classify them as part of the Western Beskids.

The highest peak of these ranges is Veľká Rača, at 1236 meters.  Most of the area is heavily forested, with some endangered species, and a large part of these ranges fall within the Kysuce Protected Landscape Area.

Mountain ranges of Slovakia
Mountain ranges of the Western Carpathians